Max Garcia (born November 9, 1991) is an American football guard for the Arizona Cardinals of the National Football League (NFL). He was a team captain at Florida, where he was recognized as second-team all-SEC in 2014. He was drafted by the Denver Broncos in the fourth round, 133rd overall, in the 2015 NFL Draft.

Early life
Garcia was named honorable mention Class 5A All-Georgia his senior year at Norcross High School. He also competed in the shot put and discuss events. Garcia traveled to Australia in the summer of 2009 to compete in World Track meet.

College career
Garcia originally attended the University of Maryland before transferring to the University of Florida. He redshirted in 2012 due to NCAA transfer rules, and started 12 games at left tackle for Maryland in 2011. Garcia started 37-of-39 games played at the University of Florida and the University of Maryland, earning starts at left tackle, left guard and center. He was voted second-team All-Southeastern Conference as a senior at Florida after starting all 13 games at center for the Gators following an offseason transition from left tackle and left guard. Garcia graded out to more than 97 percent in his 757 snaps played, and was on the Rimington Trophy (nation’s top center) watch list. He was named SEC Offensive Lineman of the Week on two occasions. Garcia started all 12 games and saw action at both left tackle and left guard in his first year competing with the Gators, and anchored the offensive line after being the only starter to not miss time due to injury.

Garcia played in the 2015 Senior Bowl and Medal of Honor Bowl following his collegiate career.

Professional career

Denver Broncos

2015 season
Garcia was drafted by the Broncos in the fourth round, 133rd overall, in the 2015 NFL Draft. Garcia appeared in all 16 regular-season games (5 starts) and all three postseason games, seeing time at both guard positions. He made his NFL debut vs. the Baltimore Ravens on September 13, 2015. Garcia made his first start at left guard vs. the New England Patriots on November 29, 2015, seeing action in all 79 offensive snaps at both guard spots.

On February 7, 2016, Garcia was part of the Broncos team that won Super Bowl 50. In the game, the Broncos defeated the Carolina Panthers by a score of 24–10.

2016 season
Garcia was named the starting left guard for the 2016 season by head coach Gary Kubiak. Garcia started all 16 games and played every offensive snap. He allowed just three sacks in 16 games and was called for holding just twice.

2017 season
Garcia was again named starting left guard by new head coach Vance Joseph for the 2017 season. He started all 16 games at left guard for the second consecutive season. He was called for holding only one time and allowed four sacks.

2018 season
After two straight seasons as a starter, Garcia was demoted to a backup role to start the season as Ronald Leary was named the starting left guard and Connor McGovern was named the starter on the right side. He started his first game of the season at right guard in Week 6 after struggles from McGovern. He was moved over to left guard the following week after Leary suffered a torn Achilles. He started the next three games there before suffering a torn ACL in practice prior to Week 11. He was placed on injured reserve on November 20, 2018.

Arizona Cardinals
On March 14, 2019, Garcia signed with the Arizona Cardinals. He was placed on the reserve/PUP list to start the season while recovering from knee surgery. He was activated off PUP on November 6.

On March 26, 2020, Garcia was re-signed to a one-year contract by the Cardinals. On March 25, 2021, Garcia was re-signed to another one-year contract by the Cardinals.

New York Giants
On March 28, 2022, the New York Giants signed Garcia to a one-year contract. He was released on August 31, 2022 and re-signed to the practice squad.

Arizona Cardinals (second stint))
On September 10, 2022, the Arizona Cardinals signed Garcia off the Giants practice squad.

Personal life
Max Garcia's father is Mexican and his mother is of Puerto Rican descent. Garcia is a Christian.

Garcia majored in Family, Youth and Community Sciences at Florida.

References

External links
 Denver Broncos bio
 Florida Gators bio

1991 births
Living people
American sportspeople of Puerto Rican descent
American sportspeople of Mexican descent
People from Norcross, Georgia
Sportspeople from the Atlanta metropolitan area
Players of American football from Georgia (U.S. state)
American football centers
American football offensive tackles
American football offensive guards
Norcross High School alumni
Maryland Terrapins football players
Florida Gators football players
Denver Broncos players
Arizona Cardinals players
New York Giants players